Concerto em Lisboa is an album released on November 6, 2006 by fado singer Mariza. It was nominated in 2007 for a Latin Grammy in the category of Best Folk Album, becoming the first Portuguese artist to receive a nomination for a Latin Grammy Award.

Production
The album was released on both DVD and CD. Recorded in 2005, the concert took place in the gardens in front of Torre de Belém, in the neighborhood of Lisbon. Mariza was accompanied by an orchestra, Sinfonietta de Lisboa, conducted by Jaques Morelenbaum, the producer and arranger of her album, Transparente. The concert was attended by around 25,000 people.

Arrangement
Concerto em Lisboa contains live interpretations of the songs from Transparente, and also from Mariza's first and second albums, re-arranged for orchestra—including "Medo", "Há uma música do Povo", "Meu Fado Meu', "Cavaleiro Monge", "Há Palavras Que Nos Beijam", and "Ó Gente Da Minha Terra".

"I lived in a traditional Lisbon neighbourhood and have always sung the fado - I know what it is, I understand myself through it." – Mariza

Certifications

Album

Video

References

External links
Mariza.com

Mariza live albums
2006 live albums
Portuguese-language live albums